Hans Bang (11 August 1863 – 21 April 1945) was a Norwegian judge.

He was born in Risør to merchant Hans Bang and Adama Schanche. He graduated as cand.jur. in 1886, and was named as a Supreme Court Justice from 1919. He participated in several governmental commissions, particularly on tax issues, and chaired Trustkontrollrådet from 1926.

References

1863 births
1945 deaths
People from Risør
Supreme Court of Norway justices